Francisco Javier Morales (born October 27, 1999) is a Venezuelan professional baseball pitcher in the Philadelphia Phillies organization.

Career
Morales signed with the Philadelphia Phillies organization as an international free agent on July 2, 2016. He made his professional debut with the GCL Phillies, posting a 3–2 record and 3.05 ERA in 10 appearances. The next year, Morales played for the Low-A Williamsport Crosscutters, logging a 4–5 record and 5.27 ERA with 68 strikeouts in 56.1 innings of work. In 2019 he played for the Single-A Lakewood BlueClaws, pitching to a 1–8 record and 3.82 ERA with 129 strikeouts in 96.2 innings pitched. Morales did not play in a game in 2020 due to the cancellation of the minor league season because of the COVID-19 pandemic. The Phillies added him to their 40-man roster after the 2020 season. He was assigned to the Double-A Reading Fightin Phils to begin the 2021 season. On July 3, he pitched a combined no-hitter against the Erie SeaWolves along with Kyle Dohy, Zach Warren, and Brian Marconi.

On May 9, 2022, Morales was promoted to the major leagues for the first time when Zach Eflin was placed on the COVID-19 injured list. Morales made his MLB debut the same day, pitching 2 shutout innings against the Seattle Mariners. 

On January 4, 2023, Morales was designated for assignment by the Phillies after the signing of Craig Kimbrel was made official. On January 11, he was assigned outright to the Triple-A Lehigh Valley IronPigs.

References

External links

1999 births
Living people
Major League Baseball players from Venezuela
Major League Baseball pitchers
Philadelphia Phillies players
Florida Complex League Phillies players
Williamsport Crosscutters players
Lakewood BlueClaws players
Reading Fightin Phils players
Lehigh Valley IronPigs players